Sun Yuan (born 1972) and Peng Yu (born 1974) are artists living and working collaboratively in Beijing since the late 1990s. 

Sun was born in Beijing and Peng in Heilongjiang. Sun and Peng are contemporary conceptual artists whose work has reputation for being confrontational and provocative. In 2001, they won the Contemporary Chinese Art Award.Their artwork is considered to be controversial as they create pieces that dive deep into human nature, psychological, and political experiences.

Life and works
Sun Yuan and Peng Yu are famous for working with unconventional media such as taxidermy, human fat, and machinery. 

In the controversial "Dogs Which Cannot Touch Each Other", eight dogs (four pairs facing one another) were strapped onto treadmills in a public installation.Speculation occurred with this exhibit, as it used living dogs for performance as part of the art. It was purposely provocative, and organizations such as PETA criticized the piece. This was part of the exhibition “Art and China after 1989: Theater of the World”. The Guggenheim later released a statement, explaining the artist’s intentions and perspective. This piece was eventually removed from the Guggenheim’s digital archive.

For the 2005 Venice Biennale, the duo invited Chinese farmer Du Wenda to present his homemade UFO at the Chinese Pavilion.

The installation "Old People's Home", (2008) comprised 13 hyperrealistic sculptures of elderly world leaders, including Yasser Arafat and Leonid Brezhnev, in electric wheelchairs set to automatically wander through the room and bump into one another.

"Angel" (2008) is a fiberglass angel sculpture complete with flesh-covered wings, white hair, and frighteningly realistic skin that features details like wrinkles, sunspots, and peach fuzz.

Their 2009 solo exhibition, "Freedom", at Tang Contemporary in Beijing, featured a large firehose hooked to a chain that erupted water spray at a distance of 120 meters and thrashed throughout an enormous metal cage.

Sun and Peng's 2016 work, "Can’t Help Myself," was commissioned for the Guggenheim Museum. It was displayed as part of the Tales of Our Time exhibition at the Guggenheim in Manhattan. The work consists of a large KUKA industrial robot with a robotic arm and visual sensors behind clear acrylic walls. The robot was programmed to endlessly attempt to sweep red, viscous, blood-like liquid into a circle around its base, in the process spreading and splattering the "blood." The robot is also programmed with thirty-two "dance moves" and reacts to people around it. These "dance moves" became more depressed and erratic as time went on, and eventually stopped operating in 2019. In 2021 and 2022, the piece gained attention through social media, opening up several interpretations for the meaning behind the art. "Can't Help Myself" was also displayed in the 2019 Venice Biennale's main exhibition, "May You Live in Interesting Times."

Selected exhibitions

2016

Tales of Our Time, Guggenheim Museum, NY

2009

Unveiled: New Art From The Middle East, Saatchi Gallery, London, UK

2006

Liverpool Biennial, Tang Contemporary Art, Liverpool, UK

2005

Higher, F2 Gallery, Beijing, China (solo)

Mahjong: Chinese Contemporary Art from Uli Sigg Collection, Art Museum Bern, Switzerland

The 51st Venice Biennale (China Pavilion), Venice

To Each His Own, Zero Art Space, Beijing

Ten Thousand Years Post-Contemporary City, Beijing

2004

Ghent Spring, Contemporary Art Financial Award, Ghent, Belgium (solo)

Between Past and Future:  New Photography and Video From China, Seattle Art Museum, Seattle, USA

Australia:  Asia Traffic, Asia-Australia Arts Centre

The Virtue and the Vice:  le Moine et le Demon, Museum of Contemporary Art, Lyon, France

All Under Heaven:  Ancient and Contemporary Chinese Art, The Collection of the Guy and Myriam Ullens Foundation, MuHKA Museum of Contemporary Art, Antwerp, Belgium

What is Art?, Shanxi Art Museum, Xi’an, China

Australia - Asia Traffic, Asia-Australia Arts Centre, Australia

Gwangju Biennale, Gwangju, Korea

2003

Second Hand Reality:  Post Reality, Today Art Museum, Beijing, China

Left Wing, Beijing

Return to Nature, Shenghua Arts Centre, Nanjing, China

2002

The First Guangzhou Triennial, Guangzhou Art Museum, Guangzhou, China

2001

Get Out of Control, Berlin, Germany

Yokohama 2001 International Triennial of Contemporary Art, Yokohama, Japan

Winner: The Contemporary Chinese Art Award of CCAA, Beijing

2000

Indulge in Hurt, Sculpture Research Fellow of Central Academy of Fine Arts, Beijing

5th Biennale of Lyon, Lyon Museum of Contemporary Art, Lyon, France

Fuck Off!, Donglang Gallery, Shanghai

1999

Post-Sense Sensibility Alien Bodies & Delusion (Basement), Beijing

1997

Counter-Perspectives: The Environment & Us, Beijing

Inside, Tongdao Gallery Central Academy of Fine Arts, Beijing

References

External links
The artists’ official site
Sun Yuan and Peng Yu on ArtNet.com
Sun Yuan and Peng Yu’s contribution to the 2001 Yokohama Triennale
Further information from the Saatchi Gallery

Chinese contemporary artists
Art duos
Animal cruelty incidents